Thomas Scott Hening (July 26, 1871 – April 29, 1934) was an American medical doctor and Democratic politician who served as a member of the Virginia Senate. There he represented the state's 16th district from 1916 to 1924.

References

External links
 
 

1871 births
1934 deaths
Democratic Party Virginia state senators
People from Powhatan County, Virginia
Physicians from Virginia
20th-century American politicians
20th-century American physicians